Laytham is a village in the East Riding of Yorkshire, England.

There is currently 1 working farm and approximately 10 houses. Some are being built on an old farm.

Laytham forms part of the civil parish of Foggathorpe.

In 1823 Laytham was in the parish of Aughton and the Wapentake of Harthill. Occupations included seven farmers, with a gentleman in residence.

References

External links

Villages in the East Riding of Yorkshire